The Kermadec Plate is a very long and narrow tectonic plate located west of the Kermadec Trench in the south Pacific Ocean. Also included on this tectonic plate is a small portion of the North Island of New Zealand and the Kermadec Islands. It is separated from the Australian Plate by a long divergent boundary which forms a back-arc basin. This area is highly prone to earthquakes and tsunami.

See also
 Tonga-Kermadec Ridge

References

Tectonic plates
Geology of New Zealand
Geography of the New Zealand seabed
Geology of the Pacific Ocean